Buddug Williams (1932 – 24 July 2021) was a Welsh actress, best known for her roles in the long-running television soap Pobol y Cwm on S4C – first as the mother of Sabrina and Reg. She had a long-running role playing 'Anti' Marian Rees – the fearsome, gossipy, opinionated shopkeeping auntie of the hapless Denzil – from 2000 to 2016. The character died in her sleep in her armchair at Penrhewl farm.

Prior to her acting career, Williams worked as a teacher. Her autobiography, Merch o'r Cwm, written in Welsh, was published in 2008. In it she described her upbringing in Cefneithin and mentioned her friendships with Ronnie Williams and Carwyn James.

Film and television

References

External links

Welsh soap opera actresses
Living people
Place of birth missing (living people)
Welsh film actresses
Welsh-speaking actors
1932 births